RNase D is one of the seven exoribonucleases identified in E. coli. It is a 3'-5' exoribonuclease which has been shown to be involved in the 3' processing of various stable RNA molecules.   RNase D has homologues in many other organisms. When a part of another larger protein has a domain that is very similar to RNase D, this is called an RNase D domain.

References

External links 
 Crystal structure of E. coli RNase D at the RCSB Protein Data Bank

Ribonucleases
EC 3.1.13